Fritz Christian Mauch (1905-1940) was a German film editor and assistant director. He also co-directed the 1938 documentary film España heroica about the Spanish Civil War.

Selected filmography

Editor
  (1934)
 The Brenken Case (1934)
 Elisabeth and the Fool (1934)
 Every Day Isn't Sunday (1935)
 The Hour of Temptation (1936)
 The Impossible Woman (1936)
 The Yellow Flag (1937)
 The Gambler (1938)

References

Bibliography
 Noël Maureen Valis. Teaching Representations of the Spanish Civil War. Modern Language Association of America, 2007.

External links

Year of birth unknown
Year of death unknown
German film editors